Mark Kassen (born 1971) is an American actor, director and producer. He has appeared in the films Growing Up Brady (2000), The Good Student (2006), Puncture (2011), and Jobs (2013). In July 2020, he and Chris Evans launched A Starting Point, a website that presents both the Democratic and Republican point of view on many issues of importance to Americans.

Career

Theatre
In 1994, he made his theatre debut in a New York Off Broadway play titled Judy at the Stonewall Inn. A few years later,  he was cast in a play called Things You Shouldn't Say Past Midnight which he appeared on stage totally nude. In 2006, he appeared as Hitler's nephew William Patrick Hitler in the play Little Willy, which he also wrote.

Film and television
Kassen has had small parts in television films and TV series such as Another World in 1994, Cybill in 1997, and Third Watch 1999. In 2006, he produced the television movie Bernard and Doris with Susan Sarandon and Ralph Fiennes, which earned him, along with the other producers, nominations for a Golden Globe and Primetime Emmy Award for Best Television Film.

In 2011, he appeared in the drama film Puncture, based on the true story of Michael David Weiss (played by Chris Evans), where Kassen played Weiss's law partner and best friend Paul Danziger. Kassen also directed and produced the film with his brother Adam Kassen.

It was announced in December 2013 that Kassen would star in the upcoming indie film Alone where he will play a 35-year-old veteran battling PTSD alongside Sophie Turner and Ray Liotta.

Production company
Kassen runs an independent film production company with his younger brother Adam Kassen.

Filmography

As producer

References

External links

1971 births
Living people
American film directors
American male film actors
American film producers